In astrophysics, photodissociation regions (or photon-dominated regions, PDRs) are predominantly neutral regions of the interstellar medium in which far ultraviolet photons strongly influence the gas chemistry and act as the most important source of heat. They occur in any region of interstellar gas that is dense and cold enough to remain neutral, but that has too low a column density to prevent the penetration of far-UV photons from distant, massive stars. A typical and well-studied example is the gas at the boundary of a giant molecular cloud. PDRs are also associated with HII regions, reflection nebulae, active galactic nuclei, and Planetary nebulae. All the atomic gas and most of the molecular gas in the galaxy is found in PDRs.

History
The study of photodissociation regions began from early observations of the star-forming regions Orion A and M17 which showed neutral areas bright in infrared radiation lying outside ionised HII regions.

References

Astrophysics
Interstellar media